Central Virginia Regional Library serves Buckingham and Prince Edward counties in Virginia, United States. The library system is within Region 2 of Virginia Library Association (VLA).

Service area 
According to the FY 2014 Institute of Museum and Library Services Data Catalog, the Library System has a service area population of 40,662 with one central library and one branch library.

Branches 
 Buckingham County Public Library (Dillwyn)
 Farmville-Prince Edward Community Library (Farmville)

References 

Public libraries in Virginia
Buckingham County, Virginia
Education in Prince Edward County, Virginia